Raketa mena is a 2007 documentary film.

Synopsis 
On the coast of Androy, the southernmost point of Madagascar, the weather conditions don't allow the fishermen to go fishing very often. The dunes build up, day by day, over fertile land. But that's not the worst. The population is missing the most important element, water. To calm their thirst and hunger, many villages eat "raketa mena", a cactus whose scientific name is Opuntia stricta. But this cactus is an invader that dries out the land. What is the solution?

Awards 
 Ciné Sud de Cozès 2007

External links 

2007 films
Malagasy documentary films
2007 documentary films
Documentary films about water and the environment